Alicia Molik and Mara Santangelo were the defending champions, but lost in the first round to Sara Errani and Bethanie Mattek.

Anabel Medina Garrigues and Virginia Ruano Pascual won the title, defeating Casey Dellacqua and Francesca Schiavone in the final 2–6, 7–5, 6–4.

Seeds

Draw

Finals

Top half

Section 1

Section 2

Bottom half

Section 3

Section 4

External links 
 Draw
2008 French Open – Women's draws and results at the International Tennis Federation

Women's Doubles
French Open by year – Women's doubles
French Open – Women's doubles
French Open – Women's doubles